Events from the year 1708 in art.

Events
 Flemish painter and engraver Pieter Casteels III comes to work in Britain.
 Czech sculptor Ferdinand Brokoff sets up his own studio.

Paintings
 Michael Dahl – Portrait of George Mackenzie, 1st Earl of Cromartie
 Antonino Grano – Frescoes in Church of Santa Maria della Pietà in Kalsa, Palermo
 Enoch Seeman
 Group portrait of the Bisset family
 Self-portrait

Drawings
 Portrait of Anne Hathaway by Nathaniel Curzon

Publications
 Roger de Piles – Cours de peinture par principes avec un balance de peintres

Births
 January 25 – Pompeo Girolamo Batoni, Italian painter (died 1787)
 June 20 – François-Elie Vincent, Swiss painter of portrait miniatures  (died 1790)
 December 18 – John Collier, English caricaturist and satirist (died 1786)
 date unknown
 Francis Hayman, English painter and illustrator (died 1776)
 Giuseppe Ghedini, Italian painter and later a university professor of painting (died 1791)
 Mina Kolokolnikov, Russian painter and teacher (died 1775)
 Johann Jakob Zeiller, Austrian fresco painter (died 1783)

Deaths
 April – Abraham Storck, Dutch landscape and marine painter (born 1644)
 April 6 – Willem van Ingen, Dutch Golden Age painter active in Italy (born 1651)
 April 19 – Angiola Teresa Moratori Scanabecchi, Italian woman composer and painter active in Bologna (born 1662)
 June 10 – Romeyn de Hooghe, Dutch engraver and caricaturist (born 1645)
 August 16 – Michel Corneille the Younger, French painter, etcher and engraver (born 1642)
 September 6 – Evert Collier, Dutch painter (born 1640)
 October 22 – Cesare Pronti, Italian painter of quadratura and allegorical figures (born 1626)
 October 26 – Johann Kerseboom, German portrait painter (born unknown)
 November 17 – Ludolf Bakhuysen, Dutch painter (born 1630)
 November 20 – Paul Strudel, Austrian sculptor, architect, engineer and painter (born 1648)
 date unknown
 Giovanni Ventura Borghese, Italian painter  (born 1640)
 Francesco Ferrari, Italian painter and architect (born 1634)
 Catharina Oostfries, Dutch glass painter (born 1636)
 Paolo Antonio Paderna, Italian painter of Bologna (born 1649)
 Jan van Kessel the Younger, Flemish painter active in Spain (born 1654)
 probable
 Michiel Maddersteg, Dutch painter (born 1662)
 Pietro da Pietri, Italian painter of an altarpiece for Santa Maria in Via Lata (born 1663)
 Zou Zhe, Chinese Qing dynasty painter (born 1636)

References

 
Years of the 18th century in art
1700s in art